Music Idol was the Bulgarian version of the British television hit show Pop Idol. It was a talent contest to determine the superior pop performer. Its first season was aired on bTV from February 26 until June 7, 2007. During its third season, the show went international and auditions took place in neighboring Macedonia. Other major changes in the third season: minimum age for participants 13 (not 16), more talk show than music, great accent on the hosts, hidden vote results, which makes it impossible to validate the result of each elimination.

Rules

Season 1

Qualifications
Auditioners must be between the ages of 13 and 28. They must be Bulgarian citizens.

Auditions
Castings are held in the five biggest cities in Bulgaria - Rousse, Varna, Bourgas, Plovdiv and Sofia. After a pre-selection the contenders audition in front of the panel of judges seen on TV who will decide if they are going to make it to the next round.

Theatre Round
In three days the judges chose among the top 100, from all cities, the semifinalists who would perform live during the show and face the public's vote.

Semifinals
From now on it is up to the Bulgarian public to vote their favorite contestants into the final 12.

Finals
Each week the final 12 contestants perform, in front of a live audience, songs from a given theme. Once again the public votes for its favorite with the fewest votes getter being eliminated after one show until only one contestant remains: The winner of Music Idol.

Season 2

Qualifications
There is no age limit for the auditioners. They must be Bulgarian citizens.

Auditions
Castings are held in the five biggest cities in Bulgaria - Rousse, Varna, Bourgas, Plovdiv and Sofia. After a pre-selection the contenders audition in front of the panel of judges, seen on TV, who will decide if they are going to make it to the next round.

Theatre Round
The competitors are split in groups and they sing solo (like in the previous round). After that the jury decides who will continue. After that the remaining contestants sing in quartets and the jury picks the best of them. Then they sing solo and the jury picks 18 people for the semi-finals.

Semifinals
The competitors are split in two groups − male and female. After their first concert the public votes for them and two boys and two girls are eliminated. After that they have another concert and two boys and two girls are again eliminated. After that the eliminated eight contestants sing again and three of them are let back in the show.

Finals
Each week the final 13 contestants perform in front of a live audience songs from a given theme. Once again the public votes for its favorite, the two people with the fewest votes sing and the public votes again. The contestant with the fewest votes is eliminated. This goes on until only one contestant remains: The winner of Music Idol.

Season 1

Judges
Donnie − singer and composer
Yordanka Hristova (chairman) − singer
Gloria Ivanova − pop-folk singer
Slavi Trifonov − singer, host

Auditions
Rousse (January 18)
Varna (January 25)
Burgas (February 1)
Plovdiv (February 8)
Sofia (February 15)

There was one exception to the age-rule − Kremena from Dobrich was allowed to participate, despite her age of 15. She eventually became a finalist later on.

Semifinals
For one week (March 12 to March 19) the top 40 performed each night in five groups including eight singers with the two top vote getters advancing to the finals. On Friday night the judges announced eight singers who received another chance to perform with the top vote getter and the final pick of the judges joining the other finalists to the top 12.

Group 1 − March 12, 2007
Tihomir Dimitrov (17.9%)
Preslava Peycheva (9.3%)
Emiliya Valenti (11.0%)
Syuleyman Evadpal
Nikolay Manolov (17.4%)
Krasimira Ivanova (26.3%)
Preslava Mravkova
Ina Petrova

Group 2 − March 13, 2007
Daniela Nikolova (6.4%)
Vasil Modev (11.8%)
Ivaylo Donkov (7.4%)
Stefan Lalchev (30.0%)
Maya Georgieva
Mariya Dimitrova
Valentina Dimitrova (26.5%)
Rosen Kukosharov

Group 3 − March 14, 2007
Gita Petkova (8.4%)
Yanitsa Dafinova
Iskren Ribchev (15.6%)
Plamen Patov (31.3%)
Veselina Nikolova
Gergana Koyeva (10.6%)
Rumen Nehrizov (18.0%)
Aneliya Bakalova

Group 4 − March 15, 2007
Lazar Valchev (8.9%)
Silvia Moneva (12.1%)
Vasil Chergov
Plamena Petrova
Georgi Georgiev
Denislav Novev (9.6%)
Iliana Kovacheva (15.6%)
Nevena Tsoneva (35.5%)

Group 5 − March 16, 2007
Dimitar Atanasov
Teodor Koychinov (7.8%)
Maria Bachvarova (8.0%)
Vasko Ivanov (9.7%)
Kremena Dimitrova (30.8%)
Vasil Stoyanov
Denitsa Hadzhiivanova (24.4%)
Kristina Kokorska

Wildcards − March 19, 2007
Vasko Ivanov
Kristina Kokorska
Lazar Valchev
Teodor Koichinov (Judges' Choice)
Dimitar Atanasov
Nikolay Manolov
Preslava Peycheva (Viewers' Choice)
Silvia Moneva

Finals elimination chart

Season 2

Judges
Lucy Diakovska - No Angels member
Vili Kazasyan (chairman) - Bulgarian conductor
Esil Duran - pop-folk and jazzsinger
Dimitar Kovachev - "Funky" - Bulgarian rocker and producer, owner of Sofia Music Enterprises

Auditions
Rousse (January 17)
Varna (January 24)
Burgas (January 31)
Plovdiv (February 7)
Sofia (February 14)

Semifinals
This year saw a change in the semifinal format: After the judges picked their top 18 contestants (9 males, 9 females) the contestants were split in one girls/guys group and had to perform in the week of March 10 − March 15 with constant reduction of the number of singers in both groups to six: after the first performance show the two fewest votes getters got eliminated, leaving the top 7 of girls/guys perform again of which the top 5 vote-getters from each group will advance to the finals. Later on the judges eventually decided to make a top 13 out of the supposed 12, giving three contestants a wildcard for the finals.
Two out of the top 18, Denislav Novev and Plamena Petrova, had already competed in a former year's top 50 but failed to qualify for the finals.

Girls Top 9 − March 10, 2008
Plamena Petrova - "Think Twice"
Gergana Dimova - "Black Velvet" (eliminated)
Maria Ilieva - "(You make me feel like) A Natural Woman"
Chanel Erkin - "Je T'aime"
Elena Ivanova - "Man! I Feel Like A Woman" (eliminated)
Ana Topalova - "Visoko" (bottom three)
Sonia Membrenho - "Iskam te"
Nora Karaivanova - "The Voice Within"
Denitsa Georgieva - "Respect"

Guys Top 9 − March 11, 2008
Ivan Angelov - "Change The World"
Ivaylo Donev - "Georgia On My Mind"
Yasen Zerdev - "New Flame" (eliminated)
Denislav Novev - "You Rise Me Up"
Toma Zdravkov - "Summer In The City"
Damyan Popov - "Pochti zabravena ljubov"
Viktor Georgiev - "Stars" (eliminated)
Lazar Kisyov - "Sbogom , moya ljubov" (bottom three)
Stoyan Tsonev - "Incomplete"

Girls Top 7 − March 13, 2008
Maria Ilieva - "Adagio" (eliminated)
Denitsa Georgieva - "Proud Mary"
Chanel Erkin - "Bleeding Love" (bottom three)
Sonia Membrenho - "Listen" (eliminated)
Ana Topalova - "Every Breath you take"
Plamena Petrova - "Ustrem"
Nora Karaivanova - "Ain't no Sunshine"

Guys Top 7 − March 15, 2008
Toma Zdravkov - "Walking By Myself"
Damyan Popov - "Svetat e za dvama" (eliminated)
Denislav Novev - "Let Me Entertain You"
Stoyan Tsonev - "Sineva"
Lazar Kisyov - "I Surrender" (eliminated)
Ivaylo Donev - "Great Balls Of Fire"
Ivan Angelov - "Se bastasse una canzone"

Wildcards − March 18, 2008
Chosen by the judges to advance to the finals:
Yasen Zerdev
Maria Ilieva
Elena Ivanova

NOTE: The bottom group contestants face off in a sudden death elimination round where the voting lines are re-opened and the public have one more chance to save their favorite from elimination. Stoyan Tsonev, Ana Topalova and Chanel Erkin fell victim to this unique rule despite not receiving the fewest votes on the performance night.

Finals elimination chart

Season 3

Judges
Doni − Bulgarian pop singer
Maria − pop-folk singer
Dimitar Kovachev − "Funky" − Bulgarian rocker and producer

Unlike the previous seasons, there is no chairman of the jury in honor to the late chairman Vili Kazasyan, who died shortly after the 2008 season. Nevertheless, there is a guest star in the jury in every city, where auditions take place. He/She does not have a right to vote, but can advise jury members in reaching the right decision. The guest stars for the 2009 season are:

Sonia Vassi − Bulgarian singer and model (Varna)
Toni Dimitrova − Bulgarian pop singer (Burgas)
Blagovest Argirov - Bulgarian pop singer (Plovdiv)
Grigor Koprov − famous Macedonian songwriter (Skopje)
Katya − Bulgarian pop singer, part of the famous duo "Riton" (Sofia)

Auditions

 Varna (January 24)
 Burgas
 Plovdiv
 Skopje, Macedonia
 Sofia

Finalists 
 Rusina Katardzieva  - Eliminated
 Sonia Membreno - Eliminated
 Preslava Mravkova - Eliminated
 Aleksandar Tarabunov - Eliminated
 Boyan Stoykov - Runner-Up
 Eli Radanova - Eliminated
 Simona Stateva - Eliminated
 Viktoria Dimitrova - Withdrew
 Darko Ilievski - Eliminated
 Dimitar Atanasov - Eliminated
 Aleksandra Zhekova - Eliminated
 Magdalena Janavarova -  Winner
Plamen Petkov - Eliminated

Finals elimination chart

 Viktoria Dimitrova withdrew from the show on the rock concert, thus saving Simona Stateva and Preslava Mravkova from elimination.

Music Idol Facts
 Winners: 2 females and 1 male
 Oldest Students: Stoyan Tsonev - 29 years old
 Youngest Students: Simona Stateva - 13 years old
 Shortest Stay: Denitsa Hadzhiivanova, Elena Ivanova, Plamen Petkov
 Most Saving Students: Toma Zdravkov

Notes

External links
 Official website

Idols (franchise)
Bulgarian television series
Bulgarian music television series
Bulgarian reality television series
2000s Bulgarian television series
2007 Bulgarian television series debuts
2007 Bulgarian television series endings
2008 Bulgarian television series endings
2009 Bulgarian television series endings
Music competitions in Bulgaria
Bulgarian television series based on British television series
BTV (Bulgaria) original programming